Alexander Webster Hall (6 November 1908 – 5 September 1991) was a Scottish footballer who played as a left back.

Club career
Sunderland acquired Hall from Dunfermline Athletic for £750 in 1929. He made his debut on 4 May 1929 in a 0–4 loss against Sheffield United at Bramall Lane, and was placed on the reserve list until the 1934–35 season. In his time at Sunderland, he made 235 appearances (discounting three void league games in 1939) with only one goal, and led the club to victory in the 1936 FA Charity Shield and 1937 FA Cup Final. The Second World War saw him move to Hibernian, initially as a guest player then a permanent signing, where he played over 200 wartime games then made one appearance in the 1946–47 season.

References

1908 births
1991 deaths
Footballers from West Lothian
Scottish footballers
Dunfermline Athletic F.C. players
Sunderland A.F.C. players
Hibernian F.C. players
Hibernian F.C. wartime guest players
Scottish Junior Football Association players
Scottish Football League players
English Football League players
Association football fullbacks
FA Cup Final players